Glipostenoda nigriceps is a species of beetle in the genus Glipostenoda. It was described in 1968.

References

nigriceps
Beetles described in 1968